Roger "Jack" Parker (September 27, 1915 – May 29, 1964) was an American athlete who competed mainly in the Decathlon.

He competed for a United States in the 1936 Summer Olympics held in Berlin, Germany in the Decathlon where he won the bronze medal.

Parker was an all around track and field athlete from Lamoni High School in Lamoni, Iowa.  In 1933, Parker fell three points shy of winning the Iowa state high school team championship single-handedly, winning six events at the state finals.  He was invited to the National High School Championships held in Chicago, where he placed second in the long jump behind another high school star of his day, Jesse Owens.  Parker was recruited to Sacramento City College, where he was coached by L.D. Weldon.

References 

Biography of Jack Parker

1915 births
1964 deaths
American male decathletes
Athletes (track and field) at the 1936 Summer Olympics
Olympic bronze medalists for the United States in track and field
Medalists at the 1936 Summer Olympics